The 2014 Federated Auto Parts 400 was a NASCAR Sprint Cup Series stock car race that was held on September 6, 2014, at Richmond International Raceway in Richmond, Virginia. Contested over 400 laps, it was the 26th race of the 2014 NASCAR Sprint Cup Series, and the final race prior to the Chase for the Sprint Cup, to decide the series champion. Brad Keselowski finished first after he dominated the race, leading 383 of the race's 400 laps. Jeff Gordon finished second while Clint Bowyer, Jamie McMurray, and Kevin Harvick rounded out the top five. The top rookies of the race were Kyle Larson (11th), Austin Dillon (20th), and Justin Allgaier (28th).

Previous week's race
Kasey Kahne took the lead on the second green-white-checker attempt and held off Matt Kenseth to score his first win of the season, at the Oral-B USA 500 at Atlanta Motor Speedway. Kahne felt that his car was "all over the place during the race but the guys stayed with me and worked hard", but felt proud that they had sealed his place in the Chase for the Sprint Cup. Kenseth described the last two laps as "really intense", but also felt that "things are looking up" for the Joe Gibbs Racing driver. His team mate Denny Hamlin finished third, but felt he "couldn't capitalize, couldn't get the restarts and couldn't accelerate", while third was the best he could have imagined for the race.

Report

Background
It hosts the NASCAR Sprint Cup Series and Nationwide Series, and formerly hosted a NASCAR Camping World Truck Series race, a Verizon IndyCar Series race, and two United States Auto Club sprint car races.

With the race weekend being the final event before the Chase for the Sprint Cup commenced, there were numerous scenarios in play in order for the remaining places to the 16-driver Chase to be sealed. Numerous drivers inside the top 30 in points had the opportunity to seal a spot in the Chase with a victory in Richmond, while Ryan Newman, Greg Biffle, Clint Bowyer and Kyle Larson. With them being inside the top 30 in points, Paul Menard, Austin Dillon, Jamie McMurray, Brian Vickers, Marcos Ambrose, Casey Mears, Martin Truex Jr., Tony Stewart, Ricky Stenhouse Jr., Danica Patrick, Justin Allgaier, Michael Annett, David Gilliland, David Ragan and Cole Whitt could only qualify for the Chase with a win.

Instead of using the normal 33, Circle Sport Racing team owner Joe Falk ran the number 90 to honor former team owner and Richmond native Junie Donlavey.

Entry list
The entry list for the Federated Auto Parts 400 was released on Tuesday, September 2, 2014 at 8:32 a.m. Eastern time. Forty-four drivers were entered for the race.

Practice

First practice
The session was three hours in length – unusual for NASCAR – because Goodyear brought an entirely new tire compound and NASCAR wanted the teams to have as much time as possible to test the new tires.

Final practice
Brian Vickers switched to a backup car after blowing the left-rear tire of his car, which resulted in hitting the wall in turn two. Upon exiting his car, Vickers stated that he had "lost the left rear going down the front stretch" and that he "did the best I could to keep it off the wall".

Qualifying
Keselowski expressed that it was "a great start to the wekeend but still got a long ways to go" but also stated that he was "excited and I feel like we have a shot to win". Jeff Gordon joined Keselowski on the front row, praising his rival's lap time; he was almost a tenth of a second clear at the end of qualifying. Gordon praised his own team's ethic as well, stating "to be up here on the front row, that's certainly a great effort". Clay Rogers, who was attempting to make his first start, was the only driver that failed to qualify.

Qualifying results

Race

First half

Start

The race was scheduled to start at 7:43 p.m. Eastern time, but started five minutes later with Brad Keselowski leading the field to the green. Keselowski held the race lead for the majority of the first stint, before he was passed by Kevin Harvick, on lap 43. The caution flag flew for the first time, for a scheduled competition caution on lap 51, due to rain showers earlier in the day; Keselowski retook the lead on pit road, and held the lead for the restart, on lap 58. Again, Keselowski led for a large portion of the race, before Harvick retook the lead on lap 120. Further down the order, Matt Kenseth made light contact with the wall in turn 1, but the caution flag was not brought out until lap 124. However, this was for an unrelated incident, as debris on the backstretch brought out the second caution of the race. Keselowski returned to the lead after his pit crew bettered Harvick's crew for their respective service; it was a lead he would not relinquish for the rest of the night.

Second half

Drunk fan on the fence
The race restarted on lap 132, and Keselowski continued to maintain order at the head of the order, and in the process, led his 1-thousandth lap of the season on lap 158. Debris brought out the third caution of the race on lap 262, with the restart on lap 271. One further caution occurred later in the race, when a fan ascended the catch fencing at turn 4, on lap 330. The fan was later arrested and charged with disorderly conduct and being drunk in public. The race restarted with 64 laps to go, and Keselowski held the front until the end – having led 383 of the race's 400 laps – to take his fourth win of the season and the top seeding for the Chase for the Sprint Cup.

Post-race
Keselowski stated in his post-race interview that he had "pinched myself once to make sure I wasn't dreaming. These are nights you don't forget as a driver and you live for", while stating that his car was "just flying" and that he "couldn't ask for a better way to enter the Chase than to win and take the first seed". Clint Bowyer finished third, and failed to overturn the points disadvantage he had, to make the Chase. Bowyer expressed disappointedly that it was "definitely frustrating not making that Chase, but like I said, when you do make the Chase, you want it to be for a championship, not just ride around in it". After his eighth-place finish, Jimmie Johnson was taken to the infield care center due to dehydration. Hendrick Motorsports team mate Dale Earnhardt Jr. – who was 12th in the finishing order – put the cause down to the ambient conditions, while also stating that he "thought I might have some trouble with it because I had a sinus cold all week" and that he "must have something going on — something that didn't agree with him today that he ate or drank". Another Hendrick driver, Jeff Gordon, also felt the conditions in his car, stating that he knew "there were a couple times when I felt like I was cramping a little bit as well".

Race results

Race statistics
 4 lead changes among different drivers
 4 cautions for 27 laps
 Time of race: 2:51:55
 Brad Keselowski won his fourth race in 2014

Media

Television

Radio

Standings after the race

Drivers' Championship standings after reset

Manufacturers' Championship standings

Note: Only the first sixteen positions are included for the driver standings.

References

Federated Auto Parts 400
Federated Auto Parts 400
Federated Auto Parts 400
NASCAR races at Richmond Raceway